Liotina peronii , common names: Peron's delphinula, wheel shell and large liotia, is a species of small sea snail, a marine gastropod mollusk, in the family Liotiidae.

Description
The size of the shell varies between 4 mm and 20 mm. The shell is shouldered, radiately distinctly ribbed to the shoulder, below which they become obsolete, with a spiral rib forming the shoulder and another just below it. The tooth is somewhat tubercular, and there are numerous small elevated spiral lirae, becoming granular below. Between the lirae there are minute punctations, and a row of large, deep pits revolves around the base. The outer lip is strongly, crenulately varicose.

Distribution
This marine species occurs in the shallow, subtidal zone of Central and West Pacific, off East India and off New South Wales, Northern Territory, Queensland, Western Australia

References

 Kiener, L.C. 1839. Scalaria, Cadran (Solarium Lamarck), Rotella, Delphinula. Partie II Genre Cadran (Solium Lamarck). 1-12, pls in Kiener, L.C. (& Fischer, P. partim) (eds). Spécies général et Iconographie des coquilles vivantes, comprenant la collection du Muséum d'histoire Naturelle de Paris, la collection de Lamarck, celle du Prince Massena (appartenant maintenant a M. le Baron B. Delessert) et les découvertes récentes des voyageurs. Paris Vol. 10. 
 Reeve, L.A. 1843. Monograph of the genus Delphinula. pls 1-5 in Reeve, L.A. (ed). Conchologia Iconica. London : L. Reeve & Co. Vol. 1.
 Pilsbry, H.A. 1934. Notes on the Gastropod Genus Liotia and its allies. Proceedings of the Academy of Natural Sciences, Philadelphia 85: 375-381
 Salvat, B. & Rives, C. 1975. Coquillages de Polynésie. Tahiti : Papeete pp. 1–391
 Jenkins, B.W. 1984. Northern Australian Liotiidae. Australian Shell News 48: 8-9
 Wilson, B. 1993. Australian Marine Shells. Prosobranch Gastropods. Kallaroo, Western Australia : Odyssey Publishing Vol. 1 408 pp

External links
 To GenBank 
 To World Register of Marine Species
 

peronii
Gastropods described in 1839